Rockenstuhl is a former municipality in the Wartburgkreis district of Thuringia, Germany. It was created in March 1994 by the merger of the former municipalities Geismar, Ketten and Spahl. Since 31 December 2008, it is part of the town Geisa.

References

Former municipalities in Thuringia